The Minneapolis College of Art and Design (MCAD) is a private college specializing in the visual arts and located in Minneapolis, Minnesota. MCAD currently enrolls approximately 800 students. MCAD is one of just a few major art schools to offer a major in comic art.

History 

MCAD was founded in 1886 by the trustees of the Minneapolis Society of Fine Arts and originally named the Minneapolis School of Fine Arts. Douglas Volk (1856–1935), an accomplished American portrait painter who studied in Paris with renowned French painter and sculptor Jean-Léon Gérôme (1824–1904), became the school's first president. Its inaugural class was held in a rented apartment in downtown Minneapolis and had an enrollment of 28 students, 26 of whom were women.
 
In December 1889, the school found a more permanent home on the top floor of the just-finished Minneapolis Public Library at 10th Street and Hennepin Avenue. In 1893, noted German-born painter and educator Robert Koehler (1850–1917) moved from New York to Minnesota to become president of the school. Over the next ten years, he developed much of the curriculum that is known today as the art education field. By the turn of the century, the school had two instructors and had instituted a summer term, in addition to night classes for people in the community. In 1910, the School of Fine Arts changed its name to the Minneapolis School of Art to reflect the new emphasis on applied arts.

In 1915, the school moved to its present location one mile south of downtown Minneapolis, and set up its classrooms and studios within the newly constructed Minneapolis Institute of Arts. The  site for the art museum and school was donated to the City of Minneapolis in 1911 by prominent local banker and businessman Clinton Morrison (1842–1913). It was formerly occupied by Villa Rosa, the home and estate of Morrison's parents Dorilus Morrison (1814–1897), the first mayor of Minneapolis, and Harriet Putnam Whitmore Morrison (1821–1880). The site of the Morrison's former estate is today held in the public trust under the jurisdiction of the Minneapolis Park and Recreation Board and is officially known as Dorilus Morrison Park.

In 1916, the school moved into its own nearby facilities in the new Julia Morrison Memorial Building, which was built with funds provided to the Minneapolis Society of Fine Arts by Dr. Angus Washburn Morrison (1883–1949) and his sister, Ethel Morrison Van Derlip (1876–1921), as a memorial to their mother, Julia Kellogg Washburn Morrison (1853–1883), the wife of Clinton Morrison. Designed by prominent Minneapolis architect Edwin Hawley Hewitt (1874–1939), a former Minneapolis Society of Fine Arts president, the Morrison Building featured three large painting studios with skylights, administrative offices, workshops and an auditorium.

In 1970, the School was renamed the Minneapolis College of Art and Design to reflect the broadening of its fine arts and liberal arts curricula. By this time, with enrollment of nearly 600 students, the college had outgrown its facilities, and in 1974 expanded into a building designed by Pritzker Prize–winning modernist architect Kenzo Tange (1913–2005) as part of the new "arts complex" that included the Children's Theatre Company and a major addition to the Minneapolis Institute of Arts.

On July 1, 1988, MCAD became a wholly independent institution, no longer governed by the Minneapolis Society of Fine Arts.

On October 19, 2016, the Full-time and Adjunct faculty unionized joining the Service Employees International Union Local 284.

Academics 

MCAD offers several degree programs.

Bachelor of Fine Arts:
The BFA program offers majors in Animation, Comic Art, Drawing and Painting, Filmmaking, Fine Arts Studio, Furniture Design, Graphic Design, Illustration, Web And Multimedia Environments, Photography, Print Paper Book, Product Design, and Sculpture.

Bachelor of Science:
The BSc program offers a major in entrepreneurial studies.

Continuing Education:
MCAD offers a number of continuing studies courses for children, teens, and adults. Adult courses are available for both enrichment and professional development.

Master of Fine Arts:
The MFA program offers disciplines in the areas of Animation, Comic Art, Drawing, Filmmaking, Furniture Design, Graphic Design, Illustration, Interactive Media, Painting, Photography, Printmaking, Sculpture. It uses a mentor-based approach in which students select a mentor from a list of MCAD faculty and professional area artists, work one-on-one with their mentors discussing their goals as an artist, and develop strategies in studio art and liberal studies seminars to meet their needs.

Master of Arts in Sustainable Design: 
Launched in 2004, MCAD's master of arts in sustainable design program was the first accredited online program, not exclusive to architecture, focusing on sustainability methodologies that can be applied to any effort. The program was developed and is taught by long-standing sustainability practitioners working in design and business, including members of Worldchanging, Biomimicry Guild, International Society of Sustainability Professionals, and the Permaculture Guild.

Master of Arts in Graphic and Web Design: MCAD's master of arts in graphic and web design is fully online. Courses cover design principles, typography, research, ideation, web design, programming, workflow management, and more.

Campus 

MCAD is located at 2501 Stevens Avenue, just south of downtown Minneapolis. It shares an eighteen-acre arts campus with the Minneapolis Institute of Art and the Children's Theatre Company. The MCAD campus consists of eight buildings and three acres of lawns and gardens.

MCAD offers student apartments for on-campus living.
122 Units
10 efficiencies
63 one-bedrooms
40 two-bedrooms
9 three-bedrooms
43 percent are furnished

The Minneapolis Japanese School, a weekend Japanese educational program designated by the Japanese Ministry of Education, previously held its classes at MCAD.

Galleries
MCAD operates one main gallery space, a gallery on the concourse, an outdoor sculpture garden, and the student-run Gallery 148. The college hosts contemporary art and design exhibitions, receptions, artist talks, and other events that are free and open to the public.

Enrollment
Total undergrads: 650
First-time degree-seeking freshmen: 140
Graduate enrollment: 44

Notable alumni and faculty
 Kinji Akagawa: Sculptor, printmaker, and arts educator best known for sculptural constructions that also serve a practical function.
 Henry Bannarn: Artist best known for his work during the Harlem Renaissance period.
 Belle Baranceanu: Artist best known for her paintings and murals.
 Tuesday Bassen: Designer best known for her eponymous label.
 Patrick Jennings Brady: Artist best known for organizing the Cig Art benefits.
 Arnold Franz Brasz: Painter, sculptor, and printmaker.
 Sarina Brewer: Sculptor known for her innovative use of taxidermy-related materials and the formation of the genre of Rogue Taxidermy Art.
 Esther Bubley: Photographer who specialized in expressive photos of ordinary people in everyday lives.
 Margaret Gove Camfferman: Painter
 James Casebere: Contemporary artist and photographer.
 Adolf Dehn: Lithographer who helped define some important movements in American art, including Regionalism, Social Realism, and caricature.
 Gregory Euclide:  Contemporary artist and teacher best known for creating the album artwork for Bon Iver, winner of the Grammy for Best New Artist.
 John Bernard Flannagan: One of the first practitioners of direct carving (also known as taille directe) in the United States.
 Wanda Gág: Artist, author, translator, and illustrator most noted for writing and illustrating the children's book Millions of Cats.
 F. Keogh Gleason: Resident set decorator at MGM studios for over 40 years
 Samara Golden: Installation artist
 Mary GrandPré: Illustrator best known for her cover and chapter illustrations of the Harry Potter books in their U.S. editions published by Scholastic.
 M.S. Harkness: Cartoonist created the graphic novels "Tinderella" and "Desperate Pleasures", featured in The New Yorker.
 Theodore Haupt: Modernist painter, sculptor, and muralist who achieved recognition for his New Yorker magazine covers.
Pao Houa Her (born 1982), photographer
 Dan Jurgens: Comic book writer and artist known for his lengthy runs on the Superman titles The Adventures of Superman and Superman (vol. 2).
 Clifton Karhu: Woodblock printer based in Japan, known for his depictions of Kyoto and Kanazawa cityscapes
 Vance A. Larson: Abstract expressionist painter and portrait painter.
 P. Scott Makela: Graphic designer, multimedia designer, and type designer especially noted for the design of Dead History, a postmodern typeface.
 Mark Mallman: Minnesota musician and composer for film.
 Linus Maurer: Cartoonist, illustrator and puzzle designer.
 Jin Meyerson: Artist with a disposition for large-scale painting of high detail.
 Chris Monroe: Cartoonist, illustrator, and author best known for her weekly comic strip "Violet Days.”
 George Morrison: Landscape painter and sculptor and part of a circle of abstract expressionists.
 Lisa Nankivil: Best known for her non-representational striped-format oil paintings and abstract monoprints.
 Patricia Olson: Graphic designer, painter, feminist artist, and educator whose works are categorized as figurative art.
 Clara Elsene Peck: Illustrator and painter known for her illustrations of women and children in the early 20th century.
 Tania del Rio: Cartoonist working mainly in comic books who has worked for Archie Comics.
 James Rosenquist: Artist and one of the protagonists in the pop-art movement.
 John Howard Sanden: Portrait artist whose subjects include former President George W. Bush and First Lady Laura Bush.
 Paul Shambroom: Photographer whose work explores power in its various forms.
 Aaron Spangler: Sculptor and printmaker whose sculptures are carved from solid blocks of basswood and finished with coats of black gesso and graphite.
 Adrien Stoutenburg: Poet and prolific writer of juvenile literature whose poetry collection Heroes, Advise Us was the 1964 Lamont Poetry Selection.
 Piotr Szyhalski: poster designer and multimedia artist.
 Pete Wagner: Political cartoonist, activist, author, scholar, and caricature artist whose work has been the subject of controversy and frequent media attention.
 Ben Willmore: Photographer, author, and entrepreneur best known for his Digital Imaging expertise and for writing the book Photoshop Studio Techniques.

See also

 List of colleges and universities in Minnesota

References

External links
Official website

Culture of Minneapolis
Art schools in Minnesota
Universities and colleges in Minneapolis
Educational institutions established in 1886
Private universities and colleges in Minnesota
1886 establishments in Minnesota
Art museums and galleries in Minnesota